The 1996–97 FA Cup (known as The FA Cup sponsored by Littlewoods for sponsorship reasons) was the 116th season of the FA Cup. The tournament started in August 1996 for clubs from non-league football and the competition proper started in October 1996 for teams from the Premier League and the Football League. 

Premier League side Manchester United were the defending champions, but were eliminated in the Fourth Round by Wimbledon.

The tournament was won by Chelsea with a 2–0 victory over Middlesbrough in the final at Wembley stadium.

Calendar

First Round Proper

Teams from the Football League Second and Third Division entered in this round plus four non-league teams were given byes to this round: Macclesfield Town, Northwich Victoria, Woking and Enfield. The matches were played on 16 November 1996. There were thirteen replays, with two ties requiring a penalty shootout to settle them.

Second Round Proper

The second round of the competition featured the winners of the first round ties. The matches were played on 7 December 1996, with four replays and one penalty shootout required.

Third Round Proper

The third round of the season's FA Cup was scheduled for Saturday, 4 January 1997, although fourteen matches were postponed until later dates. This round marked the point at which the teams in the two highest divisions in the English league system, the Premier League and the Football League First Division (now known as the Football League Championship). There were nine replays, with none of these games requiring a penalty shootout to settle it.

Fourth Round Proper

The Fourth Round ties were played with the thirty-two winners of the previous round. The matches were originally scheduled for Saturday, 25 January 1997, although six matches were not played that weekend. There was only one replay.

Fifth Round Proper

The Fifth Round matches were scheduled for Saturday, 15 February 1997. There was, again, only one replay.

Sixth Round Proper

The sixth round ties were scheduled for the weekend of 8–9 March. No replays were required.

Chesterfield defeated Wrexham 1–0 in a rare "all third-tier" quarter-final clash, while Middlesbrough's 2–0 win at Derby County moved them a step closer to their first-ever FA Cup final.

Semi-finals

The semi-final ties were played at neutral venues on 13 April 1997. Middlesbrough and Chelsea came through their ties (with Middlesbrough requiring a replay against second division side Chesterfield) to reach the final.

Wimbledon, playing the semi-finals for the first time since they were FA Cup winners nine years earlier, had their hopes of FA Cup glory ended by a semi-final defeat at the hands of Chelsea. This came just weeks after Wimbledon had been eliminated from the League Cup semi-finals.

Middlesbrough, on the other hand, reached the FA Cup final for the first time in their history, but only after a 3–0 replay win over a Chesterfield side that had given them a serious run for their money in the first match. Chesterfield narrowly missed out on becoming the first third-tier side to reach the FA Cup final after an exciting match ended in a 3–3 draw. The Spireites took a 2–0 lead in the second half and had a goal ruled out despite the ball crossing the line, which would have seen them go 3–1 up.

Replay

Final

The 1997 FA Cup Final took place on 17 May 1997 at Wembley Stadium. Chelsea were attempting to win the FA Cup for the first time in 27 years, while Middlesbrough were contesting their first ever FA Cup final, having only just competed in their first ever League Cup final one month earlier. Chelsea took to the field on the back of something of a renaissance under Dutch manager Ruud Gullit, having recorded their best league finish for a decade. Middlesbrough, on the other hand, began the final having been relegated from the Premiership and had also been losing finalists in the League Cup.

Chelsea beat Middlesbrough 2–0, with Roberto Di Matteo scoring the fastest goal in FA Cup Final history, 43 seconds after kick-off. This beat Jackie Milburn's record from the 1955 FA Cup Final, who scored after 45 seconds. Di Matteo's record was then beaten in 2009 (coincidentally against Chelsea) by Everton's Louis Saha (27.9 seconds). Eddie Newton scored the Blues' second goal in the 83rd minute to clinch the match and give Chelsea their first major trophy in 26 years.

Media coverage
For the ninth consecutive season in the United Kingdom, the BBC were the free to air broadcasters which was their last before ITV took over while Sky Sports were the subscription broadcasters.

The matches shown live on the BBC were: Manchester United 2–0 Tottenham Hotspur (R3); Chelsea 4–2 Liverpool (R4); Leicester City 2–2 Chelsea (R5); Sheffield Wednesday 0–2 Wimbledon (QF); Chelsea 3–0 Wimbledon (SF) and Chelsea 2–0 Middlesbrough (Final)

References

FA Cup Results 1996-97

 
FA Cup seasons
FA Cup
1996–97 in English football